Ross Anthony Catterall (born 9 July 1974), known by his stage name Ross Antony, is a British singer, entertainer and presenter based in Germany. He rose to fame as a member of the R&B/pop group Bro'Sis. Since the group disbanded in 2006, Antony has maintained a profile as a TV personality in Germany, culminating in his 2008 winning of Ich bin ein Star – Holt mich hier raus!, the German version of I'm a Celebrity...Get Me Out of Here!.

Personal life 
Antony came from a family of artists and was performing on stage from the age of three, receiving singing and dancing lessons.
He attended Bridgnorth Endowed School and is a graduate of the Guildford School of Acting. He went on to appear in pantomimes and musicals across England. In 1997, Antony made his debut on the German stage, with the world premiere of the musical Catharine, in Aachen. In Germany, he played many main roles, including "Claude" in the musical Hair, "Joseph" in Joseph and the Amazing Technicolor Dreamcoat, and "Tabaluga" in Tabaluga and Lilli.

Since 2006, Antony has been in a civil partnership with opera singer Paul Reeves. The couple ran a bed and breakfast in Wallingford, Oxfordshire, named "Little Gables". On 26 May 2014, Antony announced via his Facebook page that the two of them had adopted a child, which they had both spent a long time trying to do. In December 2017, Antony and Reeves married.

Antony lives near Cologne.

Musical engagement 
 1992: Soloist, Bridgnorth Endowed School
 1992: Grease (Roger), Bridgnorth Endowed School
 1994: Dick Whittington (Zeldomphed), Guildford School of Acting
 1994: Chicago (Sergeant Fogarty), Guildford School of Acting
 1994: Calamity Jane (Joe), Yvonne Arnaud Theatre
 1994: Jack the Ripper (Dinky), Bridgnorth Endowed School
 1995: Cabaret (Emcee), Guildford School of Acting
 1995: Trial by Jury (Defender), Guildford School of Acting
 1995: Troilus and Cressida (Thersites), Guildford School of Acting
 1995: A Chorus Line (Mark), Millfield Theatre with Amanda-Jane Manning as "(Diana)", Directed By Bonnie Lythgoe
 1996–1997: Cinderella (Ensemble), Marlowe Theatre
 1996–1997: La Cage aux Folles (Jean Michel), Nationwide tour
 1996–1997: Carousel (Enoch Snow), Arts and Leisure Centre Bridgnorth
 1997–1999: Joseph (Many characters), Coliseum Theatre
 1999–2000: Mozart! (Ensemble), Vienna
 2000: Dance to Win: Workshop for Miami Nights, Düsseldorf
 2000–2001: Tabaluga and Lilli (Tabaluga), CentrO Oberhausen
 2001: Hair (Ensemble), Bremen
 2005: Elisabeth (Crown Prince Rudolf), SI-Centrum Stuttgart
 2006: Saturday Night Fever (Bobby C), Frankfurt Old Opera

Discography

Solo albums

Musical albums

Solo singles

References

Literature 
 Nadja Otterbach, Ross Antony:  The Inside Me – Das Leben eines Popstars. Machtwortverlag, Dessau 2007,  .

External links 

 Official website
 Official website of The Inside Me
 Common artist's homepage of Paul Reeves and Ross Antony
 

1974 births
Living people
People from Bridgnorth
People educated at Bridgnorth Endowed School
Alumni of the Guildford School of Acting
English male musical theatre actors
English male singers
English pop singers
Schlager musicians
Ich bin ein Star – Holt mich hier raus! winners
English LGBT singers
German television personalities
English expatriates in Germany
Popstars winners